Loretta Mary Grace Mazza (born 8 September 1957) is a Sammarinese politician, Mayor (Capitano di Castello) of Acquaviva between 2009 and 22 February 2013, when she resigned and was succeeded by Lucia Tamagnini on 20 March 2013.

Mazza was born in New York City, United States, on 8 September 1957.

She won the 2009 Sammarinese local elections in Acquaviva after receiving 415 votes.

References

1957 births
Living people
Politicians from New York City
Mayors of places in San Marino
Women mayors of places in San Marino
Sammarinese women in politics
21st-century women politicians